HMIS Indus was a  of the Royal Indian Navy launched in 1934 and sunk during the Second World War in 1942. She was a slightly enlarged version of other vessels in the Grimsby class. She was named after the Indus River. Indus served mainly as an escort vessel, and she was therefore lightly armed. Her pennant number was changed to U67 in 1940.

History
Indus was a part of the Eastern Fleet during the war.

In March 1942, British Indian Army and British Army troops from Rangoon had to be withdrawn, as they were overwhelmed by the superior numbers as well as the air command of the Japanese. Akyab was the next port to be attacked by the Japanese in April. On 6 April, Indus suffered 3 direct bomb hits in an air raid by Japanese Mitsubishi G3M bombers, and sank in 35 minutes. There was no loss of life to her crew although 10 were injured.

Fate
On 6 April 1942 Indus was bombed and sunk by Japanese aircraft off Akyab, Burma in position

Commanding officers
Indus commanding officers during her service were:
Commander Eric George Guilding (24 November 1938 – 23 September 1941)
Lieutenant Commander Jesser Evelyn Napier (23 September 1941 – 6 April 1942) - promoted to commander on 25 October 1941
Commander James Wilfred Jefford

See also

Notes

References
 

 
 
 
 
 

Grimsby-class sloops of the Royal Indian Navy
Sloops of the United Kingdom
Ships sunk by Japanese aircraft
1934 ships
World War II shipwrecks in the Indian Ocean
Maritime incidents in April 1942